Nine-pins (or ninepins, 9-pins and other spellings) may refer to:

Nine-pin billiards, also known as goriziana
Nine-pin bowling
Skittles (sport), especially the Greater London variant